Government Centre station (formerly known as Grandin/Government Centre station) is an Edmonton Light Rail Transit station in Edmonton, Alberta, Canada. It serves both the Capital Line and the Metro Line. It is an underground station located beneath 110 Street between 99 Avenue and 98 Avenue. The station provides service to the Government Centre part of the downtown core and the neighbourhood of Oliver. The station is connected to the Alberta Legislature Building and several other government buildings by underground walkways of the Edmonton Pedway.

History
Government Centre station was opened as Grandin station in September 1989 when the LRT system was extended 0.8 km south from the Corona station through a light rail tunnel running beneath the downtown core.

Grandin station was the southern terminus of the LRT line prior to the construction of Dudley B. Menzies Bridge and the opening of University station in August 1992.

Renaming
In June 2021, Edmonton City Council voted unanimously to remove the name 'Grandin' from the station, due to Bishop Vital-Justin Grandin's active involvement in Canada's Indian residential schools system and the cultural genocide of Indigenous peoples. 'Government Centre' is currently used as the station's interim name.

Station layout
The platform is a 123-metre-long centre-loading platform that can accommodate two five-car LRT trains at the same time, with one train on each side of the platform. The platform is just over eight metres wide. Access to the platform is from the surface by stairs and escalators located at each end of the platform. The escalator and stairs at the south end of the platform connect to a pedway system that provides access to several government buildings near the station. This pedway is separate from, and not part of, the Edmonton pedway system.

Public art
The station's west wall featured a mural of Bishop Vital-Justin Grandin, the first Catholic bishop in Alberta. After criticism from local First Nations activists that the Nadeau mural could be interpreted as celebratory of the Indian residential schools system, local artist Aaron Paquette was commissioned to create a second "response" mural from a First Nations cultural perspective. Following a decision by Edmonton City Council in June 2021, the mural of Grandin was covered.

Around the station

Alberta Legislature Building
Edmonton General Hospital
Grandin School
High Level Bridge
High Level Bridge Streetcar
Oliver

Government Centre Transit Centre

The Government Centre Transit Centre is located on 107 Street south of 99 Avenue, adjacent to the Legislature grounds, and three blocks east of the Government Centre station. The transit centre is served by ETS, St. Albert Transit (StAT) and Strathcona County Transit (SCT). There are few amenities at the transit centre itself, other than a large shelter.

The following bus routes serve the transit centre:

The above list does not include LRT services from the adjacent LRT station.

References

Edmonton Light Rail Transit stations
1989 establishments in Alberta
Railway stations in Canada opened in 1989
Edmonton Transit Service transit centres
Capital Line
Metro Line